Simonne Jones (born Simonne Michelle Jones in Los Angeles, California) is a producer, singer, composer, model and visual artist based in Berlin.

Early life 
Simonne Jones was born and raised in Hollywood, California. She is of Cherokee and Barbadian descent. Her maternal great-grandfather, Sir Frank Mortimer Maglinne Worrell, is an accomplished West Indies cricketer and senator. Simonne grew up playing the piano. She taught herself to read music at age 3 and by age ten started composing music. As a young teen, Jones began to produce her own music while learning to become a multi-instrumentalist.

When Jones was 15, she graduated high school by homeschooling herself. A year later, Elite Model Management signed Jones to a modeling contract at age 16. That same year, she moved across the country and began her college career at the University of Maryland, Baltimore County where she received her bachelor's degree in Biomedical research, and Visual arts with honors in 2008. While there, Jones pursued both scientific and artistic interests. These included being awarded a research grant to implement an HIV awareness program in Ghana and working for the Howard Hughes Medical Institute to conduct nuclear magnetic resonance imaging studies, and molecular cloning on mutated HIV-1 cells in an attempt to find a cure for the disease. She also debuted her first exhibition as a visual artist at Studio Art Center International (SACI) in Florence, Italy in 2007 and held her first solo exhibition as a painter in Manhattan.

Jones, after being accepted into medical school, changed her mind on a medical career and moved to Berlin to pursue a career in music. The Guardian wrote, "When faced with the decision between a career in science or music, she chose both.

Career

2012-2015: First steps in the music industry 

Jones took her first steps as a professional musician when she was asked to perform at a Diesel show for Berlin fashion week in 2012. Jones was taken on as a protege by Peaches, who instilled artistic autonomy by encouraging her to engineer and produce recording sessions. They collaborated on the song Free Pussy Riot as a political protest to the imprisonment of the Russian performance artists Pussy Riot.

In 2013 Jones was photographed for the cover of Missy Magazine. That year she was accepted into the Red Bull Music Academy in New York City. During this time she was invited to compose and perform as a soloist with the ORSO philharmonic orchestra and choir in Freiburg, Germany conducted by Wolfgang Rose. Shortly after she scored and performed in the play Jedermann directed by Bastian Kraft, premiering at the prestigious Salzburg Festival, also making her acting debut playing the character Death. Jones performed her compositions in the play as a one-woman orchestra in China at Tianjin's Grand Theater, the Kurtheater Baden in Switzerland, the Theater Duisburg in Germany before the play moved to a residency at the Thalia Theater in Hamburg for the next 3 years. In 2014, she was invited to open for American rock band Thirty Seconds to Mars.

Jones completed a six-month artist residency at Berlin's art collective Platoon Kunsthalle where she constructed motion activated, MIDI-controlled, LED paintings exploring topics in physics and cosmology. She engineered them using open source computer controllers with her best friend, ArbitraryY, a software engineer in the aerospace industry. At the time Jones was involved in DIY audio performing with self-built midi controllers, synthesizers, LED costumes and complex loop machines. Jones also performs as a DJ, playing dark electronic music in nightclubs.

2015-present: Soundhunters, Rub and Gravity 
Jones explored music as a spiritual ritual in the Brazilian Amazon during an immersive indigenous experience in Jean Michel Jarre's documentary Soundhunters in 2015 with the Guaraní people. She released the song "The Silver Cord" in an album curated by Jean Michel Jarre called Zoolook Revisited inspired by his 1984 Zoolook album.

Jones has written and produced for other artists including the song "Vaginoplasty" with Peaches and Vice Cooler for her Rub album. She makes a cameo in the music video. Jones produced the remix "Sick in the Head" for the Rub Remixed album. Peaches also contributed a remix to Simonne's debut single as an exclusive premiere in Billboard magazine.

Jones gave several lectures about how the integration of science and art inform her artwork including at the inaugural Blue Dot Festival at the Jodrell Bank Observatory in Manchester and the Make Sound Festival in Leicester.

In 2016, she used gravitational wave audio from the collision of black holes form LIGO and collaborated with CERN using representations of real time particle collision data from the large hadron collider in the song "Alchemy".

On 27 May 2016 Jones released the debut single and music video for "Gravity" worldwide via Universal/Capitol Records.

In 2021, Jones performed as a vocalist on Sneaker Pimps' first album in nearly 20 years, Squaring the Circle.

Musical style and influences 
Jones produces, records and writes most of her music and lyrics alone in her studio and describes her music style as dark pop. Her music has experimented with elements of pop, sythpop, dream pop, punk, alternative, baroque pop, electronica and electro.  She uses Pro Tools, Logic, Ableton and various analog synthesizers to produce.

Fusion described Jones' style, saying she "uses her background in scientific theory to write electro-pop songs that lyrically reference complex concepts like relativity and gravity while sounding both otherworldly and like a hymn you’ve always known."

Lena Dunham's newsletter Lenny Letter described, "Jones, who is a lover of science and a former biomedical researcher, cites her interest in concepts like the theory of relativity and other natural phenomena in her music as being fueled by her fascination with the "unknown mysteries of the universe."

Jones describes a production technique in Popular Science, "In Spooky Action I used sounds from a UK researcher who translates star pulses into audio waves to better understand them [...] I created a sound library where I can play the stars on a keyboard."

The music production software company Native Instruments released a Simonne Jones drum kit in the virtual instrument plug-in called Battery of sounds specific to her production style.

Her style has been compared to PJ Harvey, Nine Inch Nails, Florence And The Machine and Grimes.

Discography

Singles

As a lead artist

As a featured artist or writer

As a producer

Awards and honors

Tours

Headlining
Sowo tour (Italy, 2013)
ORSO philharmonic (Germany 2013)
Untitled tour (Italy, 2015)
Thalia Theater tour (China, Germany, Austria, Switzerland, 2014-2016)

Supporting
Poliça (2012)
Thirty Seconds to Mars, Love, Lust, Faith and Dreams Tour (2013)
Peaches, Rub Tour (2016)

References

External links 
 simonnejones.com

1987 births
Living people
African-American women composers
21st-century American composers
Female models from California
Record producers from California
American women painters
African-American painters
American women record producers
American people of Barbadian descent
American people of Cherokee descent
21st-century women composers
21st-century African-American women singers